The Women's Moguls event in freestyle skiing at the 2006 Winter Olympics in Turin, Italy took place on 11 February.

Results

Qualification
Hannah Kearney, the winner of the event at the 2005 World Championship, failed to qualify for the final, while Canadian Jennifer Heil, the World Cup leader finished over a point ahead of the competition in her qualifying race.

Final
Heil, the top qualifier, started last, and was up against the time of Norwegian Kari Traa, who improved on her qualifying sum by 1.39 points. However, Heil's total of 26.50 was nearly a point better than Traa, which gave her the gold.

References

Women's freestyle skiing at the 2006 Winter Olympics
2006 in women's sport
Women's events at the 2006 Winter Olympics